Jerusalem the Golden is a novel by Margaret Drabble published in 1967, and is a winner of the James Tait Black Memorial Prize in 1967.

Development and title
Jerusalem the Golden resembles a number of autobiographical elements: like Clara, Drabble grew up in Yorkshire, was the middle of three sisters, and some of the characters resemble family members. Mrs Maugham is "based on [Drabble's] maternal grandmother."

The title is taken from the hymn of the same name; frequently Drabble uses titles that point towards Biblical references: such as in The Millstone and The Needle's Eye.

Characters

Clara Maugham - the main character for the novel. Clara is a young intelligent, attractive and bright student in her final year at a London university.
Clelia -  an artist and actress whom Clara envies and wants to emulate.
Mrs. Maugham - Clara's "miserable" mother, loosely "based on [Drabble's] maternal grandmother." Critic Lisa Allardice attributes the mean personality to a "pinched interior life".

Themes
Like many of Drabble's other novels, the novel focuses on topics relevant to women and gender. For example, G. Suchita describes the novel as exhibiting "liberationist tendencies" familiar with the feminist trends of 1960's. Suchita compares the female protagonist, Clara, to other women characters Emma from The Garrick Year and Louise from A Summer Bird-Cage, both which use "sex as a social advancement", creating power over men through sexual conquest. However, as critic Lisa Allardice noted she isn't writing "feminist" novels, but "merely writing about the world around her, and her own experiences as a young woman during the period".

Similarly, in reviewing the novel for The Guardian, critic Lisa Allardice noted the importance of intense female relationships, in a format similar to other novels by Drabble, including her earlier novels:  debut novel A Summer Bird-Cage and The Waterfall.

Intertextuality
Drabble writes the novel into the larger literary tradition, by evoking motifs and features from numerous other works. The title is a biblical reference, and she "frequently evokes" Thomas Hardy, making explicit references to Tess of the D'Urbervilles. When reviewing the book, critic Lisa Allardice also notes the close resemblance of the novel's structure and plot to the later An Experiment in Love by Hilary Mantel.

Critical reception
In rereading the novel at the time of its republication with Penguin Modern Classics, critic Lisa Allardice described the novel as " very much a fairytale of its time". Allardice described the novel as successful, and exhibiting the "moral ambiguity and wisdom of Drabble's early fiction, along with the wit and elegance of her prose." She concluded by claiming that it should be as well read as its predecessor, The Millstone.

Further reading

References

1967 British novels
Novels by Margaret Drabble
Weidenfeld & Nicolson books